Mitch Clark (born ) is a New Zealand Māori international rugby league footballer who plays as a  for the Baroudeurs de Pia XIII in the Elite One Championship.

He has previously played for the Penrith Panthers in the Holden Cup, Doncaster in Kingstone Press championship, and the Bradford Bulls and Hull Kingston Rovers in the Championship. He played one game at the York City Knights in 2017 on dual registration from Hull Kingston Rovers, before moving to Castleford (Heritage № 985) in the top flight. He spent time on loan from the Tigers in 2018. He played one game for Halifax RLFC on dual registration in 2019. Clark also played for the Leigh Centurions in the Championship.

Background
Clark was born in Pontefract, West Yorkshire, England.

He is of New Zealand heritage, however he was born in England while his father, Trevor Clark was playing for Bradford Northern after stints with Leeds Rhinos and Featherstone Rovers. He followed in his father's footsteps in 2016 when he débuted for the Bradford Bulls against Whitehaven.

Early career
Clark played in the Toyota Cup under-20s competition in 2012 with the Penrith Panthers before the competition was renamed the Holden Cup in 2013. He played in the 2013 Holden Cup Grand final for the Penrith Panthers over the New Zealand Warriors and scored a try in the 30-42 victory.

He represented the Junior Kiwis in 2013 against the Junior Kangaroos beaten 38-26 at WIN Jubilee Oval Kograh on 13 October.

Playing career

Doncaster
Clark spent 2015 with Doncaster.

Bradford Bulls
Clark joined the Bradford Bulls in 2016 but did not feature in the pre-season friendlies against Castleford Tigers and Leeds Rhinos.

He played in Round 2 (Whitehaven) to Round 12 (London Broncos). Mitch played in Round 14 (Sheffield Eagles) to Round 18 (Batley Bulldogs). He featured in the Championship Shield in Game 3 (Oldham) to the Final (Sheffield Eagles). Clark played in the Challenge Cup in the 4th Round (Dewsbury Rams). He scored against Workington Town (2 tries), Leigh Centurions (1 try), Oldham (1 try) and Dewsbury Rams (1 try).

Hull Kingston Rovers
Mitch Clark signed a 1-year deal with the Hull Kingston Rovers for the 2017 season.

Clark featured in Round 1 (Bradford Bulls) to Round 4 (Oldham).

Castleford Tigers
In October 2017 he signed for the Castleford Tigers on a two-year deal.

Wigan Warriors
Clark moved to the Wigan Warriors ahead of the 2020 Super League season.

Newcastle Thunder (loan)
On 10 Jun 2021 it was reported that he had signed for the Newcastle Thunder in the RFL Championship on loan.

Newcastle Thunder
On 7 Nov 2021 it was reported that he had signed for Newcastle Thunder in the RFL Championship.

Baroudeurs de Pia XIII
On 24 Oct 2022 it was reported that he had signed for Baroudeurs de Pia XIII in the Elite One Championship.

References

External links

Castleford Tigers profile
Hull KR profile
Bradford Bulls profile
Clark Signs For Bradford

1993 births
Living people
Baroudeurs de Pia XIII players
Bradford Bulls players
Castleford Tigers players
Doncaster R.L.F.C. players
English rugby league players
Featherstone Rovers players
Halifax R.L.F.C. players
Hull Kingston Rovers players
Junior Kiwis players
Leigh Leopards players
New Zealand Māori rugby league team players
Newcastle Thunder players
Rugby league players from Pontefract
Rugby league props
Wigan Warriors players
York City Knights players